The Malankara Archdiocese of the Syriac Orthodox Church in North America is an ecclesiastical jurisdiction or archdiocese of the Malankara Syrian Orthodox Church for United States and Canada, incorporated in the state of New Jersey. It is a part of the Syriac Orthodox Church under the Holy See of Antioch.

The Malankara Archdiocese of the Syriac Orthodox Church in North America is under the direct ecclesiastical jurisdiction of the Patriarch of Antioch and All the East, Moran Mor Ignatius Aphrem II, the Supreme Head of the Universal Syriac Orthodox Church. This Archdiocese comprises the parishes all over the United States and Canada for the people predominantly from India who follow the Syriac tradition. The Church uses the Syriac language, a dialect of Aramaic spoken by Lord Jesus, as the liturgical language along with English and Malayalam, a vernacular language of South India. Mor Titus Yeldho is the Archbishop & Patriarchal Vicar of the Malankara Archdiocese of the Syriac Orthodox Church in North America since 2004.

History 

In the recent past, especially since the 1960s, a considerable number of people from India migrated and settled down in North America. Many of them were Malankara Jacobite Syriac Orthodox Christians. They followed the Syriac Orthodox faith, maintained their distinct identity and preserved the traditions of the Syriac Orthodox Church. With the approval and spiritual guidance of the late Archbishop Mor Athanasius Yeshue Samuel, the first Malankara Syriac Orthodox Parish in North America was formed in 1975 as Mar Gregorios Syriac Orthodox Church in Staten Island, New York. Subsequently more parishes and spiritual organizations such as Sunday School for children, Youth Association for the young adults and St. Mary’s Women’s League were formed for the spiritual nourishment of the faithful.

For the smooth functioning of the parishes under the ecclesiastical hierarchy, a Malankara Council was constituted and became fully operational in 1987. From that time onwards the Malankara Parishes conducted annual conferences in different parts of North America. As the number of people professing the Syriac Orthodox faith and their spiritual needs increased, The Delegates’ Meeting held in 1992 in New York City, presided over by the Archbishop Mor Athanasius Yeshue Samuel, decided to request The Patriarch of Antioch and All The East for a Metropolitan from Malankara to assist Mor Athanasius in administering the affairs of the Malankara Parishes. The Delegates’ Meeting held on December 5, 1992, at the St. Mark’s Syriac Orthodox Cathedral, Hackensack, New Jersey, proposed the name Fr. P.G. Cherian and requested the Patriarch to consecrate him Metropolitan to assist Mor Athanasius Yeshue Samuel.
 
According to the decision of the Archdiocesan Council, an official delegation, consisting of three clergymen and one lay member from the Council had an audience with the Patriarch, in Damascus, Syria, in June 1993 to address the spiritual needs of the Malankara faithful. Thereafter, Moran Mor Ignatius Zakka I Iwas, Patriarch of Antioch and All the East and the Supreme Head of the Universal Syriac Orthodox Church, established an independent Archdiocese directly under the Holy Apostolic See of Antioch and All the East comprising all the Malankara (India) parishes in North America and named it "Malankara Archdiocese of the Syriac Orthodox Church in North America". He consecrated and appointed P.G. Cherian as the then Mor Nicholovos Zachariah on August 15, 1993, and appointed him as Archbishop to administer the affairs of the Archdiocese.

In December 2001, Nicholovos Zachariah was excommunicated by then Patriarch Moran Mor Ignatius Zakka I Iwas. Subsequently Mor Julius Kuriakose and Mor Ivanios Mathews Metropolitans were appointed to this archdiocese. The present Archbishop Mor Titus Yeldho was consecrated as the archbishop and patriarchal vicar of the Malankara Archdiocese of the Syrian Orthodox Church in North America on January 4, 2004.

His legacy can be seen in the rise of young men coming forward, through his example, to serve the church. He is a strong advocate for empowering the youth of this archdiocese in coming forward to accept leadership responsibilities to help thrust the church into the next millennium. The current administrative set-up of the archdiocese, the previous Archdiocesan headquarters at Pomona, New York and the present archdiocesan headquarters in Whippany, New Jersey, etc. are achievements among many others that procured during the immediate years of his tenure.  A significant number of new parishes have also been initiated across the United States and Canada under his leadership.

Archbishops

 Mor Athanasius Yeshue Samuel- Until August 1993
Mor Nicholovos Zachariah - August 1993 – December 2001

Mor Julius Kuriakose - December 22, 2001 – March 1, 2002

Mor Ivanios Mathews - March 2, 2002 – January 3, 2004

Mor Titus Yeldho

Organization of the Archdiocese

Churches

Organizations
Antiochean True Faith
Archdiocesan Choir
Clergy Association
St. Paul's Fellowship
Women's League
MGSOSA - Mar Gregorios Syrian Orthodox Student Association
 MGSOYA - Mar Gregorios Syrian Orthodox Young Adults
Sunday School

External link
 Malankara Archdiocese of the Syrian Orthodox Church in North America - Official Website]

Christianity in the United States
Indian-American history
Syriac Orthodox dioceses
Members of the National Council of Churches
Oriental Orthodoxy in North America
Oriental Orthodox dioceses in the United States
Oriental Orthodox dioceses in Canada